In mathematics, plane geometry may refer to the geometry of a two-dimensional geometric object called a plane.

Most times it refers to Euclidean plane geometry, the geometry of plane figures,

More specifically it can refer to:

 Euclidean plane geometry:
 Cartesian geometry, the study of geometry using a coordinate system
 Two-dimensional space
 synthetic geometry, the study of geometry using a logical deduction and compass and straightedge constructions
geometry of a projective plane, 
 often the real projective plane,
 but possibly the complex projective plane or projective plane defined over some other field,
 either infinite or finite, such as the Fano plane, or others;
geometry of an affine plane,
geometry of a non-Euclidean plane,
 either the hyperbolic plane,
 or the elliptic plane,
 or the geometry of the related two-dimensional spherical geometry.

See also
Plane curve
Geometrography